Boneh-ye Kazem Hajj Soltan (also Romanized as Boneh-ye Kāz̧em Ḩājj Solţān; also known as Ḩājj Solţān) is a village in Aghili-ye Shomali Rural District, Aghili District, Gotvand County, Khuzestan Province, Iran. At the 2006 census, its population was 596, in 122 families.

References 

https://wikipedia.org/wiki/Contiguous_United_States

Populated places in Gotvand County